Aladar Imre, also known as Pavel Corneliu (February 14, 1898 – 1937), was a Romanian trade unionist, communist militant and member-elect of the Romanian Parliament, executed in the Soviet Union during the Great Purge.

Biography

Early life
Aladar Imre was born in 1898 in Bucharest to Janos Imre, an ethnic Hungarian lumberjack, and Maria Boer, of Romanian origins. The family had earlier left the Austro-Hungarian ruled Transylvania and moved to Romania in order to escape political persecution, the father dying when Aladar was six years old. After completing six grades, he began working as an apprentice in a carpentry workshop. It was here that Imre became interested in the study circle of the apprentices and the carpenters' trade union. Around 1911-1912, he participated in the political courses offered by the Bucharest socialist club, where militants such as I. C. Frimu, Christian Rakovsky, Dumitru Marinescu, and Mihail Gheorghiu Bujor provided guidance for the young workers. According to the commission that invalidated his Parliament seat in 1931, in 1916 Imre was drafted in the 24th Regiment of the Royal Hungarian Army.

Union leadership
In 1919 Imre joined the Circle of the Socialist Youth, the youth wing of the Socialist Party of Romania, participating in the major Bucharest strikes organised by the party in 1920. Around this period, he was also elected a member in the leadership of the carpenters' trade union. Joining the newly established Romanian Communist Party (PCdR) in 1922, Imre became responsible for the party's relations with the labour movement. In 1923 he was designated regional secretary of the Union of the Wood Workers of Romania, as well as secretary of the Bucharest Local Commission of the Trade Unions. Several important gains were obtained, such as the signing of collective agreements in a large part of the Romanian industrial enterprises and the recognition of the trade unions, including the communist-influenced Unitary Trade Unions. In late 1923, after the September Cluj Congress resulted in a major split in the labour movement, Imre managed to retain the unity of the Union of the trade unions in the timber industry and its affiliation to the General Council of the Unitary Trade Unions (CGSU), also militating for unity în the workers' movement. In the same year, as secretary of the union, he organised a 30-day-long strike of the timber industry workers in 28 enterprises and 80 carpentry workshops in Cluj, managing to achieve the acceptance of most of the workers' demands.

In 1924 Imre was arrested for political agitation, and, although the Siguranța could not confirm his lack of Romanian citizenship, the Romanian authorities decided to expel him to Hungary. The Hungarian authorities denied him entry, stating he did not have Hungarian citizenship; nevertheless the Romanian authorities forced him past the border post. After spending several hours in no man's land, he clandestinely returned to Romania. Three more attempts to expel him were made in 1924 and 1925, all having similar outcomes. In spite of persecution, he was still able to keep in contact with the labour movement. Thus, in late 1924 and 1925 he succeeded in bringing into the CGSU several trade unions from Galați and Piatra Neamț. In August 1926 he was again arrested after organising a strike among the workers of the Army's Pyrotechnics Factory in Bucharest, and in 1927 he was brought before the War Council of the Second Army Corps for leading a strike of the typographers. Accused of activities against public order, his trial was postponed several times before he was acquitted due to lack of evidence. Arrested again in March 1928, Aladar Imre was a defendant in the Cluj trial, being again acquitted.

Communist Party politics
By 1928, persecution from the Romanian authorities, coupled with differences among the leadership, threw the PCdR into disarray, with most of its militants under arrest in Romania or in self-imposed exile. The Third International (Comintern) sought to reorganise the party, and convened a congress, the 4th in the party's history, near Harkov. Hastily organised by the Communist Party of Ukraine, with almost the total exclusion of the Romanian leadership, the congress fully adopted the points of view of the Comintern. Aladar Imre was included the praesidium, and requested representatives of both the party's Central Committee (based in Romania) and the exiled political bureau be given deliberative vote. Nevertheless, he rejected the inclusion of any of the members of the former leadership in the newly established Central Committee. Imre headed the congress' commission on the labour movement, also preparing its resolution, and was elected in the party's Central Committee. During his stay in the Soviet Union, along with Vitali Holostenco, Elek Köblös, and Ion Heigel, he represented the party at the 6th World Congress of the Comintern in Moscow.

Back in Romania, he was designated secretary of the CGSU in late 1928, and in this position he was part of a committee, which also included Dumitru Grofu, Iancu Olteanu, and Coloman Müller, that organised a unionisation campaign among Romania's workers. The campaign was regarded as a success, as the number of workers affiliated with the CGSU grew from fifteen thousand to thirty thousand between November 1928 and February 1929. Beginning with April 1928, Imre was also the editor in chief of the short-lived bilingual Romanian-Hungarian newspaper Ferarul (Vasmunkás), the organ of the Unitary trade union of the workers in the chemical, metalworking and petroleum industry. In recognition of his organisational merits, the April 1929 General Congress of the CGSU held in Timișoara elected him secretary. Imre was arrested days after the Congress along several other union leaders, including Grofu, Müller, and Vasile Luca, being eventually amnestied in 1930. As a result of increased factional struggle, Aladar Imre was excluded from the Central Committee of the PCdR during the October 1929 conference.

Election to the Parliament

As the Communist Party, outlawed by the Romanian government in 1924, sought to continue participating in the country's political life, a legal front organisation was set up, the Peasant Workers' Bloc (BMȚ), in order to contest the elections. Imre joined the leadership of the Bloc in 1926, and participated on the party's list in the local elections. In the 1931 legislative elections, Imre contested for a seat in the lower chamber of the Parliament of Romania, and succeeded in being elected in the Bihor and Satu Mare constituencies. As Lucrețiu Pătrășcanu, Eugen Rozvan and another two members of BMȚ also won the popular vote, the party entered the Parliament. The election of communist deputies provoked outrage in the right-wing press, with nationalist newspaper Curentul leading a press campaign for their ousting, no matter the means. At the request of the government, a Parliament commission invalidated two of the mandates, including Imre's. As a result, the results of the Bloc were lowered below the electoral threshold, thus invalidating all the seats won. The arguments for Imre's invalidation were his supposed lack of Romanian citizenship, and a previous political conviction, amnestied in 1930. Some members of the commission, including Nicolae L. Lupu, disagreed with the conclusions, and left the commission in protests. Imre also disputed the arguments of the commission, ascertaining that, by drafting him for one month in the Romanian Army in 1927, the authorities had virtually recognised his citizenship. The left-aligned press, including Adevărul, condemned the invalidation as a government abuse. Nicolae Iorga, who at the time was serving as prime-minister, later acknowledged that the invalidation of the communist seats was based on a technicality.

Later life
The Romanian Council of Ministers decided on August 29, 1931, to expel Imre, and he chose to leave for the Soviet Union. Participating in the Fifth Congress of the PCdR that took place near Moscow that year, he joined David Avramescu in criticising the gathering's lack of representativeness, only to be rebuffed by Bela Kun. At the same Congress, as CGSU delegate, he presented a report on the Romanian trade unions. Around 1935 he was living in Tiraspol, where he published pamphlets attacking the Romanian electoral system of the time. Imre was executed by the Soviet authorities during the Great Purge. He was part of the group of Romanian victims of the purges posthumously rehabilitated in 1968 by a commission of the Romanian Communist Party.

Notes

References
 
 
 
 
 
 

1898 births
1937 deaths
Politicians from Bucharest
Romanian politicians of Hungarian descent
Carpenters
Members of the Chamber of Deputies (Romania)
Prisoners and detainees of Romania
Romanian communists
Romanian trade union leaders
Romanian emigrants to the Soviet Union
Executed communists
Great Purge victims from Romania
Socialist Republic of Romania rehabilitations